Valavanur is a former state assembly constituency in Viluppuram district in Tamil Nadu, India.

Madras State

Election results

1962

1957

References

External links
 

Viluppuram district
Former assembly constituencies of Tamil Nadu